Pop Goes the Basie is an album by pianist and bandleader Count Basie featuring jazz versions of contemporary hits recorded in 1964 and originally released on the Reprise label.

Reception

AllMusic awarded the album 3 stars.

Track listing
Side One:
 "Your Cheatin' Heart" (Hank Williams) – 3:03
 "The Hucklebuck" (Andy Gibson, Roy Alfred) – 2:50
 "Oh, Pretty Woman" (Roy Orbison, Bill Dees) – 2:51
 "Call Me Irresponsible" (Jimmy Van Heusen, Sammy Cahn) – 2:42
 "Walk Right In" (Gus Cannon, Hosea Woods) – 2:55
 "Go Away Little Girl" (Gerry Goffin, Carole King) – 3:03

Side Two:
 "Oh Soul Mio" (Billy Byers) – 3:03
 "Bye Bye Love" (Felice Bryant, Boudleaux Bryant) – 2:30
 "Do Wah Diddy Diddy" (Ellie Greenwich, Jeff Barry) – 3:04
 "He's Got The Whole World In His Hands" (Traditional) – 3:29
 "Shangri-La" (Carl Sigman, Matty Malneck, Robert Maxwell) – 3:45
 "At Long Last Love" (Cole Porter, Robert Katscher) – 2:57

Personnel 
Count Basie – piano
Al Aarons, Sonny Cohn, Wallace Davenport, Sam Noto – trumpet
Henderson Chambers (tracks 1,4, 5, 7 9, 11 & 12), Henry Coker (tracks 2, 3, 6, 8 & 10), Al Grey (tracks 1,4, 5, 7 9, 11 & 12), Grover Mitchell, Gordon Thomas (tracks 2, 3, 6, 8 & 10) – trombone
Bill Hughes – bass trombone
Marshal Royal, Bobby Plater – alto saxophone
Eddie "Lockjaw" Davis, Eric Dixon – tenor saxophone
Charlie Fowlkes – baritone saxophone
Freddie Green – guitar
Wyatt Reuther – bass
Louis Bellson, (tracks 5, 9 &12), Sonny Payne (tracks 1–4, 6–8, 9 & 11) – drums
Leon Thomas – vocals (tracks 2, 3, 6, 8 & 10)
Billy Byers – arranger, conductor

References 

1965 albums
Count Basie Orchestra albums
Reprise Records albums
Albums arranged by Billy Byers
Albums produced by Teddy Reig